Mount Deardorff is a prominent peak,  high, surmounting the massive ridge dividing the heads of Moffett Glacier and Steagall Glacier in the Queen Maud Mountains. It was first mapped from ground surveys and air photos by the Byrd Antarctic Expedition, 1928–30, and was named by the Advisory Committee on Antarctic Names for J. Evan Deardorff who made cosmic ray studies at McMurdo Station in 1964.

References
 

Mountains of the Ross Dependency
Amundsen Coast